Baron Joachim-François Philibert Julien de Feisthamel (1791–1851) was a French entomologist.

Baron Joachim de Feisthamel was a soldier, variously a major d'infanterie, colonel then maréchal de camp. He was a Member of the Société Entomologique de France and a Chevalier (Knight) of the Legion of Honour.

Works
partial list
1835 Heliconia leprieuri Annales de la Société Entomologique de France 4:631–632, plate 18
1839. Supplement a la zoologie du voyage de la Favorite comprenant la description de lepidopteres nouveaux. Mag. Zool. 9:17–26; 10 plates. [Reprinted in 1840: 13 pp., 10 pls. Paris: Bertrand] (Supplement to Laplace, Cyrille Pierre Theodore Voyage autour du monde par les mers de l'Inde et de Chine : execute sur la corvette de l'etat La Favorite pendant les annees 1830, 1831 et 1832 sous le commandement de M. Laplace capitaine de fregate Paris Imprimerie Royale, 1833–1839)
1850. Description de quelques Lépidoptères Rhopalocéres nouveaux ou peu connus, provenant de la Cazamance (Afrique) Annales de la Société Entomologique de France  (2) 8 : 247–262
several papers on Coleoptera in Magasin de Zoologie and Annales de la Société Entomologique de France
The butterfly Iphiclides feisthamelii was named in his honour.

References

Jean Lhoste (1987). Les Entomologistes français. 1750–1950''. INRA Éditions .

Chevaliers of the Légion d'honneur
French lepidopterists
1791 births
1851 deaths
18th-century French zoologists
19th-century French zoologists
French colonels
Date of birth missing
Date of death missing